Dogbo is a town in south-western Ivory Coast. It is a sub-prefecture of San-Pédro Department in San-Pédro Region, Bas-Sassandra District.

The far northern part of the sub-prefecture lies within Taï National Park.

Dogbo was a commune until March 2012, when it became one of 1126 communes nationwide that were abolished.
In 2014, the population of the sub-prefecture of Dogbo was 37,391.

Villages
The seven villages of the sub-prefecture of Dogbo and their population in 2014 are:
 Bloho (1 797) 
 Boua (4 056)
 Dogbo (8 634)
 Gléré (3 536)
 Gnépasso (12 216)
 Magnery (6 021)
 Mana (1131)

References

Sub-prefectures of San-Pédro Region
Former communes of Ivory Coast